Bitva extrasensov  (Russian: Битва экстрасенсов) — Battle of the Psychics — the Russian TNT TV channel, filmed in the format of the British TV show Britain's Psychic Challenge.

Production company: LLC "Kefir production"

Such programs show in the U.S. (America's Psychic Challenge), Israel (Reality  – "Power"), Bulgaria ("Ясновидци"), Azerbaijan, Ukraine, Mongolia, Georgia ( – ექსტრასენსთა ბრძოლა), Kazakhstan, Australia (The One), Lithuania, Estonia, Latvia.

The first release of the first season was aired on February 25, 2007. Now, the 23rd season has started.

Facts
One of the creators, Vladislav Severtsev, participated in the producing of the 2017 film The Bride.

Participants

First season (2007) 
 winner, 1st place — Natalya Vorotnikova (Tula, Russia)
 finalist, 2nd place — Nataliya Nosachyova
 finalist, 3rd place — Peter Sobolev
 4th place — Darya Mironova (Yekaterinburg)
 5th place —  Yevdokimova (gone on request)
 6th place — Alexander Novikov
 7th place — Camenolina «Cama» Arefieva
 8th place — Alyona Orlova (gone on request)
 9th place — Svetlana Proskurakova

Second season 
 winner, 1st place — Zuliya Rajabova (Moscow, Russia)
 finalist, 2nd place — Leonid Konovalov (Tula, Russia)
 finalist, 3rd place — Maxim Vorotnikov (Natalya Vorotnikova's brother; Tula, Russia)
 4th place — Farida Sheykhi (Moscow, Russia)
 5th place — Andrei Zateyev (Togliatti, Russia)
 6th place — Valentina Nikitenko (Rostov-on-Don, Russia)
 7th place — Andrei Senin (Engels, Saratov oblast, Russia)
 8th place — Emma Emmanuél Gerchéz, Rostov-on-Don, Russia)

Third season 
 winner, 1st place — Mahdi Ibrahim-Waffa (Moscow, Russia — Iran)
 finalist, 2nd place — Alexei Fad (Roman Fad's father; died in 2009; Cheboksary, Chuvashia, Russia)
 finalist, 3rd place — Cулу Искандер (Almaty, Kazakhstan)
 finalist, 4th place — Viktorija Zheleznova, Moscow, Russia — Sweden
 5th place — Vadim Selin (Rostov-on-Don, Russia)
 6th place — Adelinæ K’arayeva (Vladikavkaz, North Ossetia, Russia)
 7th place — Nadezda Titova (died; Kurgan, Russia)
 8th place — Olga Alexandrova
 9th place — Alexander Shelomencev
 10th place — Yegor Shemyakin

Fourth season 
 Winner, 1st place — Tursunoj Zakirova (Khujand, Tajikistan)
 Finalist, 2nd place — Roman Fad (Aleksey Fad's son — third season finalist; Cheboksary, Russia)
 Finalist, 3rd place — Aza Petrenko (Moscow, Russia)
 4th place — Nonna Khidiryan (became the finalist of the 9th season; Moscow, Russia)
 5th place — Alezander Agapit (Cheboksary, Russia)
 6th placeо — Gyulnara Bragina (Moscow, Russia)
 7th place — Tatjana Poddubnaya (Kyiv, Ukraine)
 8th place — Yevgeniya Abramovskikh (Chelyabinsk, Russia)
 9th place — Anna Belaya (Krasnodar, Russia)

Fifth season (2008) 
 Winner, 1st place — Liliya Khegaj (Obigarm, Tajikistan)
 Finalist, 2nd place — Irik Sadykov (Djizak, Uzbekistan)
 Finalist, 3rd place — Yuliya Solovjova (first season winner Natalja Vorotnikova's disciple; Tomsk, Russia)
 4th place — Seda Vardanyan (Armenia)
 5th place — Mikhail Filonenko (Saint Petersburg, Russia)
 6th place — Natalja Bars (Stavropol Krai, Russia)
 7th place — Anna Bogata (third season winner Mahdi Ibrahim-Waffa's disciple; Zvenigorod, Moscow Oblast, Russia)
 8th place — Samson Gaprindashvilli (Georgia)
 9th place — Izolda (Krasnodar, Russia)
 10th place — Denis Kholodnitskij (Saint Petersburg, Russia)

Sixth season 
 Winner, 1st place — Alexander Litvin (Troitsk, Chelyabinsk Oblast, Russia)
 Finalist, 2nd place — Ziradin Rzaev (Azerbaijan)
 Finalist, 3rd place — Ekaterina («Kajetta») Akhmetjanova (Almaty, Kazakhstan)
 4th place — Elena Smelova (Tula, Russia)
 5th place — Vlad Kadoni (11th season finalist, TVshow "Dom 2"'s participant; Novosibirsk, Russia)
 6th place — Liliya Bul (Kazakhstan)
 7th place — Alexander Ozeryanskiy (Rostov-on-Don, Russia)
 8th place — Lana Sinyavskaya (left the show on her own)
 9th place — Asijat Shabanova
 10th place — Nikolay Chumak (left the show on his own)

Seventh season (2009) 
 Winner, 1st place — Alexey Pokhabov (Achinsk, Krasnoyarsk Krai, Russia)
 Finalist, 2nd place — Ilona Novosyolova (died in 2017; Pavlovsky Posad, Moscow Oblast, Russia)
 Finalist, 3rd place — Bakhyt Zhumatova (Oral, Kazakhstan)
 4th place — Dilya Abdrashitova (Kazan, Russia)
 5th place — Viktoriya Aronova (Sofia, Bulgaria)
 6th place — Igor Gornostaev (Dolgoprudny, Moscow Oblast, Russia)
 7th place — Albina Selitskaya (Hlybokaye, Vitebsk Region, Belarus)
 8th place — Rano Zakirova (fourth season winner Tursunoj Zakirova's daughter; Khujand, Tajikistan)
 9th place — Maiza Golovina (Kislovodsk, Stavropol Krai, Russia)

Eighth season 
 Winner, 1st place — Vladimir Muranov (Zvenigorod, Moscow Oblast, Russia)
 Finalist, 2nd place — Dilaram Saparova, winner of Kazakh version of "Bitva" – «The One» (Shymkent, Kazakhstan)
 Finalist, 3rd place — Galina Bagirova (Baku, Azerbaijan)
 4th place — Alsu Gazimzyanova (Anatoly Emelyanov's wife; left the show on her own before the final, giving somebody way to the final (black envelope wasn't opened); was pregnant during the season; Kazan, Russia)
 5th place — Anatoly Emelyanov (Alsu Gazimzyanova's husband; Kazan, Russia)
 6th place — Ivan Volokhin (Engels, Saratov Oblast, Russia)
 7th place — Valery (Valex) Buyak (Minsk, Belarus)
 8th place — Natalya Yevstigneeva (Moscow, Russia)
 9th place — Gala Polischuk (Galina Bulatsevskaya) (Minsk, Belarus; finalist of the Ukrainian version of "Bitva")

Ninth season (2010) 
 Winner, 1st place — Natalya Banteeva (Saint Petersburg, Russia)
 Finalist, 2nd place — Nonna Khidiryan (fourth season participant; Moscow, Russia)
 Finalist, 3rd place — Valentin Divin (Moscow, Russia)
 4th place — Ilmira Derbentseva (Volgograd, Russia)
 5th place — Flyura Shafikova (tenth season participant Jamilya Satieva's mother; Makhachkala, Russia)
 6th place — Yury Isparyants (died on 5 March 2012 of cerebral hemorrhage; (Vitebsk, Belarus)
 7th place — Sergey Khorkov (Rostov-on-Don, Russia)
 8th place — Yury Olenin (Pavlovsky Posad, Moscow Oblast, Russia)
 9th place — Galina Ovchinnikova (Great Britain)

Tenth season 
 Winner, 1st place — Mohsen Noruzi (Tehran, Iran)
 Finalist, 2nd place — Elena Lyulyakova (Tambov, Russia)
 Finalist, 3rd place — Tatyana Karakhanova (Fryazino, Russia)
 4th place — Alexey Pedin (ninth season winner Natalya Banteeva's disciple, Moscow, Russia)
 5th place — Yuliya Korneeva (Moscow, Russia)
 6th place — Vera Sertakova (Tomsk, Russia)
 7th place — Liliya Martynova (Samara, Russia)
 8th place — Jamilya Satieva (ninth season participant Flyura Shafikova's daughter; Makhachkala, Russia)
 9th place — Konstantin Yampolsky (Voronezh, Russia)
 10th place — Anna Shutenkova (Tomsk, Russia)

Eleventh season (2011) 
 Winner, 1st place — Vitaly Gibert (Elista, Saint Petersburg, Russia)
 Finalist, 2nd place — Victoria Subota (Moscow, Russia)
 Finalist, 3rd place — Vlad Kadoni (6th season participant, 5th place; TVshow "Dom 2"'s participant; Novosibirsk, Russia)
 Finalist, 4th place — Anika Sokolskaya (finalist of Lithuanian version of "Bitva" Vilnius, Lithuania)
 5th place — Dmitry Trotsky (left the show on his own)
 6th place — Irina Kuznetsova
 7th place — Margarita Korsun
 8th place — Olga Sedova
 9th place — Inna Chudinova
 10th place — Polina Podolskaya

Four participants made it through to the final. That was the second one-season after the third "Bitva", which also had four finalists. 11th season was also the first one, which had a more than 39 000 vote difference between the winner and the silver medalist.

Twelfth season 
 Winner, 1st place — Elena Yasevich (Belarus; Saint Petersburg, Russia)
 Finalist, 2nd place — Anatoly Ledenyov (Moscow, Russia)
 Finalist, 3rd place — Victoriya Komakhina (Moscow, Russia)
 4th place — Роза Люлякова (tenth season finalist Elena Lyulyakova's sister, Moscow, Russia)
 5th place — Tudyv, pregnant, (Mongolia)
 6th place — Aliya Salimova (Samara, Russia)
 7th place — Ilya Obukhov (Ulan-Ude, Russia)
 8th place — Alexey Grishin (Saint Petersburg, Russia)
 9th place — Andrey Batoev (Ulan-Ude, Russia)
 10th place — Vladimir Sorokin (Voronezh, Russia) (left the show on his own)

Thirteenth season 
 winner, 1st place — Dimitri Volhov (Дмитрий Волхов) (66,3%)
 finalist, 2nd place — Jelena Golunova (Елена Голунова) (25,3%)
 finalist, 3rd place — Veet  (Вит Мано) (5,5%)
 finalist, 4th place — Fatima Hadujeva (Фатима Хадуева) (2,9%)
 5th place — Valentina Serdyuk
 6th place — Alexey Pedin (ninth season winner Natalya Banteeva's disciple; tenth season participant, 4th place Moscow, Russia)
 7th place — Mustafa Mohammed Amin Zaki
 8th place — Elena Eliadze (left the show on her own)
 9th place — Tatyana Ikaeva
 10th place — Gabriel Panyan
 11th place — Kseniya Razhikova
 12th place — Lyudmila Davidenko
 13th place — Mikhail Nevsky

Fourteenth season 
 winner, 1st place — Alexandr Sheps (Александр Шепс) (88%)
 finalist, 2nd place — Marilyn Kerro (Мерилин Керро) (9,7%)
 finalist, 3rd place — Jekaterina Ryzikova (Екатерина Рыжикова) (1,7%)
 finalist, 4th place — Danis Glinshtein (Данис Глинштейн) (0,6%)
 5th place — Alla Rotter (left the show on her own)
 6th place — Nadira Azamatova
 7th place — Arbor Usmanov
 8th place — Elena Smelova
 9th place — Anar Abdullaev
 10th place — Tamare Gagua
 11th place — Todor Todorov
 12th place — Airat Khazeev

Fifteenth season (2014) 
 winner, 1st place — Julia Vang (Джулия Ванг) (78,5%; 32.326 votes) 
 finalist, 2nd place — Tatiana Larina (Татьяна Ларина) (19,9%; 8.203 votes) 
 finalist, 3rd place — Jekaterina Borisova (Екатерина Борисова) (1,1%; 460 votes) 
 finalist, 4th place — Arseni Karadja (Арсений Караджа) (0,5%; 202 votes)
 5th place — Yuly Mitkevich-Daletsky (London, Great Britain) (was in relationship with Tatyana Larina during the season and after)
 6th place — Maya Dzidzishvili (left the show on her own instead of Yuly Mitkevich-Daletsky)
 7th place — Nikita Platonov
 8th place — Evgeny Znagovan
 9th place — Master Gakhan
 10th place — Alexey Shavyrkin
 11th place — Oleg Kornelius
 12th place — Vasilisa Shatunova

Sixteenth season (2015) 
 winner, 1st place — Viktoria Raidos (Виктория Райдос) (50,9%, 33 994 votes)
 finalist, 2nd place — Marilyn Kerro (Мерилин Керро) (47,4%, 32 427 votes)
 finalist, 3rd place — Nikol Kuznetsova/Matveeva (Николь Кузнецова/Матвеева) (1,7%, 1 163 votes)
 4th place — Nantar Enzigal
 5th place — Sergey Romanenko (Saint Petersburg, Russia) (nationality – vepsian)
 6th place — Yakov Sheyerson (13th season 2nd place of Ukrainian version of "Bitva")
 7th place — Iolanta & Rossa Voronovy (mother & daughter)
 8th place — Pakhom (Sergey Pakhomov – whacky) (left the show on his own instead of Iolanta & Rossa Voronovy)
 9th place — Georgy Malinovsky
 10th place — Alla Pele (Donetsk)
 11th place — Angelina Gortueva

Seventeenth season (2016) 
 Winner, 1st place - Swami Darshi (Свами Даши) (53,5%; 720 761 votes)
 Finalist, 2nd place - Marilyn Kerro (Мерилин Керро) (36,3%; 488 532 votes)
 Finalist, 3rd place - Nadezhda Shevchenko (Надежда Шевченко) (5,7%; 76 266 votes)
 Finalist, 4th place - Dariya Voskoboyeva (Дария Воскобоева) (4,5% 61 235 votes；Died in 2019)
 5th place — Ivan Vlasov
 6th place — Denis Vysotsky
 7th place — Violetta Polyakova (left the show because of brain injury in the same stage with Maria Gan)
 7th place — Maria Gan (left the show on her own because of being pregnant (?))
 9th place — Anton Mamon
 10th place — Elena Davidova (left the show on her own)
 11th place — Olga Dombrovskaya
 12th place — Lyubomir Bogoyavlensky
 13th place — Margarita Bakhtiyarova

Eighteenth season (2017) 
 Winner, 1st place - Konstantin Getsati (Константин Гецати) (53,17%)
 Finalist, 2nd place - Sophia Egorova (Софья Егорова) (20,71%)
 Finalist, 3rd place - Alexander Kinzhinov (Александр Кинжинов) (17,86%)
 Finalist, 4th place - Jean and Dana Alibekovs (Жан и Дана Алибековы) (8,26%)
 5th place — Marina Zueva (left the show on her own)
 6th place — Ivan Shabanov
 7th place — Nikita Turchin 
 7th place — Irina Volkova (left the show on her own)
 9th place — Irina Maklakova
 10th place — Rustam Zartdinov
 11th place — Olesya Molchanova
 12th place — Maxim Nikitin

Nineteenth season (2018) 
 Winner, 1st place - Tmofei Rudenko
 Finalist, 2nd place - Aida Grifal (Аида Грифаль)
 Finalist, 3rd place - Grigoriy Kuznetsov (Григорий Кузнецов) 
 4th & 5th place - Yuli Kotov (Юлий Котов) & Manana Marshunova (Манана Маршунова)
 6th place — Maria Schweide
 7th place — Varvara Paninа
 8th place — Natalia Abramovich
 9th place — Vitaly Bortsov
 10th place — Svetlana Nazarova
 11th place — Artemy and Vladimir Nikara
 12th place — George Malinovsky

References 

TNT (Russian TV channel) original programming
2010s Russian television series
2000s Russian television series
2007 Russian television series debuts
Russian television series based on British television series
Russian reality television series